Events from the year 1985 in the United States.

Incumbents

Federal government 
 President: Ronald Reagan (R-California)
 Vice President: George H. W. Bush (R-Texas)
 Chief Justice: Warren E. Burger (Minnesota)
 Speaker of the House of Representatives: Tip O'Neill (D-Massachusetts)
 Senate Majority Leader: Howard Baker (R-Tennessee) (until January 3), Bob Dole (R-Kansas) (starting January 3)
 Congress: 98th (until January 3), 99th (starting January 3)

Events

January

 January 20
President Ronald Reagan and Vice President George H. W. Bush are privately sworn in for a second term in office (publicly sworn in, January 21).
Super Bowl XIX: The San Francisco 49ers defeat the Miami Dolphins 38–16 at Stanford Stadium in Palo Alto, California.
 January 28 – In Hollywood, California, the charity single "We Are the World" is recorded by USA for Africa. Like the enormously successful "Do They Know It's Christmas?" that was recorded by Band Aid in the UK two months prior, the single raises money to combat the ongoing famine in Ethiopia. The American act consists of high-profile performers, including Michael Jackson, Lionel Richie, Tina Turner, Cyndi Lauper and Diana Ross.

February
 February 5 – Australia cancels its involvement in United States-led MX missile tests.
 February 6 – President Reagan delivers his fourth State of the Union Address to the Congress. The congress sings Happy Birthday to him afterwards.
 February 9 – U.S. drug agent Enrique Camarena is kidnapped and murdered in Mexico (his body is discovered on March 5).
 February 13 – Bobby Knight throws a chair across a basketball court.
 February 14
 CNN reporter Jeremy Levin is freed from captivity in Lebanon.
 21-year-old female singer Whitney Houston releases her debut album – Whitney Houston.
February 20
 Clarence Nash, voice actor,  famous for make the Donald Duck voice.

March
 March 1 – The GNU Manifesto by Richard Stallman is published for the first time.
 March 4 – The Food and Drug Administration approves a blood test for AIDS, used since then to screen all blood donations in the United States.
 March 6 – Boxer Mike Tyson makes his professional debut in Albany, New York, a match which he wins by a first-round knockout.
 March 8 – A car bomb planted in Beirut by CIA mercenaries attempts to kill Islamic cleric Sayyed Mohammad Hussein Fadlallah. He survives, but the bomb kills more than 80 people and injures 200.
 March 16 – Associated Press newsman Terry Anderson is taken hostage in Beirut (he is eventually released on December 4, 1991).
 March 25 – The 57th Academy Awards, hosted by Jack Lemmon, are held at Dorothy Chandler Pavilion in Los Angeles, with Miloš Forman's Amadeus winning Best Picture and Best Director (Forman's second win), along with six other awards out of 11 nominations. The film is tied in nominations with David Lean's A Passage to India.
 March 31 – WrestleMania debuts at Madison Square Garden.

April
 The National Archives and Records Administration is established as an independent federal agency.
 Cincinnati, OH-based Procter & Gamble ditches the moon & stars symbol from its packaging.
 April 1 – Eighth-seeded Villanova defeats national powerhouse Georgetown, 66–64, to win the first 64-team field NCAA Tournament in Lexington, Kentucky.
 April 7 – National Geographic Explorer debuts on Nickelodeon.
 April 11 – The USS Coral Sea collides with the Ecuadorian tanker ship Napo off the coast of Cuba.
 April 12 – 1985 El Descanso bombing: A terrorist bombing attributed to the Islamic Jihad Organization in the El Descanso restaurant near Madrid, Spain, mostly attended by U.S. personnel of the Torrejon Air Force Base, causes 18 dead (all Spaniards) and 82 injured.
 April 15 –  Birth of American YouTuber Robert F. Sanders, aka: Road Guy Rob.
 April 19 – A four-day siege of white supremacist group The Covenant, The Sword, and the Arm of the Lord begins in Arkansas.
 April 23 – Coca-Cola changes its recipe and releases New Coke. The response is overwhelmingly negative, and the original formula is back on the market in less than three months.

May
 May 5 – U.S. President Ronald Reagan joins West German Chancellor Helmut Kohl for a controversial funeral service at a cemetery in Bitburg, Germany, which includes the graves of 59 elite S.S. troops from World War II.
 May 11 – The FBI brings charges against the suspected heads of the five Mafia families in New York City.
 May 13 – Philadelphia, Pennsylvania Mayor Wilson Goode orders police to storm the radical black American resistance group MOVE's headquarters to end a stand-off. The police drop an explosive device into the headquarters, killing eleven members of MOVE and destroying the homes of 61 city residents in the resulting fire.
 May 15 – An explosive device sent by the Unabomber injures John Hauser at UC Berkeley. 
 May 19 – John Anthony Walker Jr., is arrested by the FBI for passing classified Naval communications onto the Soviets.
 May 31 – Forty-one tornadoes hit in Ohio, Pennsylvania, New York and Ontario, killing 76 people.

June
 June 9 – Los Angeles Lakers win the NBA championship, defeating the Boston Celtics. 
 June 13 – In Auburn, Washington, police defuse a Unabomber bomb sent to Boeing.
 June 14 – TWA Flight 847, carrying 153 passengers from Athens to Rome, is hijacked by a Hezbollah fringe group. One passenger, U.S. Navy Petty Officer Robert Stethem, is killed.
 June 17 – John Hendricks launches the Discovery Channel in the United States.
 June 20 – NeXT is founded by Steve Jobs after he resigns from Apple Computer.
 June 24 – STS-51-G: Space Shuttle Discovery completes its mission, best remembered for having Sultan bin Salman Al Saud, the first Arab and first Muslim in space, as a payload specialist.
 June 26 – A Walt Disney World Monorail System train catches fire in Epcot around 9:00 p.m, due to friction caused by a flat tire.
 June 27 – U.S. Route 66 is officially decommissioned.

July

 July 1
 Nick at Nite, a nighttime program service with an emphasis on classic television reruns, is launched in the United States, being broadcast on the same channel as Nickelodeon.
 A&E, which previously shared Nickelodeon's channel, begins broadcasting as its own 24-hour cable channel in January of that year on a separate satellite transponder. 
 July 3 – Back to the Future opens in American theaters and ends up being the highest-grossing film of 1985 in the United States, and the first film in the successful franchise.
 July 13 
Live Aid pop concerts in Philadelphia, Pennsylvania and London raise over £50,000,000 for famine relief in Ethiopia. The English rock band Queen performs at Wembley Stadium in London for over 20 minutes. Queen's performance at the event was recreated in the 2018 film Bohemian Rhapsody.
Vice President George H. W. Bush serves as acting president for eight hours, while President Ronald Reagan undergoes colon cancer surgery under anesthesia.
 July 19 – Vice President George H. W. Bush announces that New Hampshire teacher Christa McAuliffe will become the first school teacher to ride aboard the Space Shuttle Challenger.
 July 20 – The main shipwreck site of the Spanish galleon Nuestra Señora de Atocha (which sank in 1622) is found forty miles off the coast of Key West, Florida by treasure hunters who begin to excavate $400,000,000 in coins and silver.
 July 24 
Commodore launches the Amiga personal computer at the Lincoln Center in New York City.
Walt Disney Feature Animation's 25th feature film, The Black Cauldron, is released. Considered one of the studio's darkest releases, it receives mixed reviews and results in a large revenue loss for Disney, putting the future of its animation department in jeopardy.

August
 August 2 – Delta Air Lines Flight 191 crashes near Dallas, Texas, killing 137 people.
 August 4 – Major League Baseball player Rod Carew of the California Angels becomes the sixteenth player to achieve 3,000 hits in a career.
 August 20 – Iran–Contra affair: The first arms, 96 BGM-71 TOWs, are sent to Iran in exchange for hostages in Lebanon and profits for the Nicaraguan Contras without public knowledge.
 August 25 – Samantha Smith, "Goodwill Ambassador" between the Soviet Union and the United States for writing a letter to Yuri Andropov about nuclear war, and eventually visiting the Soviet Union at Andropov's request, dies in the Bar Harbor Airlines Flight 1808 plane crash. She was 13 years old.
 August 26 – Ryan White, who was expelled from Western High School in Indiana, is allowed to attend his first day of classes via telephone.
 August 28 – The first smoking ban for restaurants in the United States is passed in Aspen, Colorado.
 August 31 – Richard Ramirez, the serial killer known as the Night Stalker, is captured in Los Angeles.

September
 September 2 – Hurricane Elena makes landfall on the U.S. Gulf Coast after reaching Category 3 status.
 September 4 – Catcher Gary Carter of the New York Mets ties a record with five home runs in two games. 
 September 6 – Midwest Express Airlines Flight 105, a Douglas DC-9, crashes just after takeoff from Milwaukee, Wisconsin, killing 31 people.
 September 11 – Pete Rose becomes the all-time hit leader in Major League Baseball, with his 4,192nd hit at Riverfront Stadium in Cincinnati.
 September 13 – Steve Jobs resigns from Apple Computer in order to found NeXT.
 September 26 – Kalina, the first captive orca born at SeaWorld as well as the first to survive past infancy, is born at SeaWorld Orlando.

October
 October 4 – The Free Software Foundation is founded in Massachusetts.
 October 7 
 The cruise ship Achille Lauro is hijacked in the Mediterranean Sea by four heavily armed Palestinian terrorists. One passenger, American Leon Klinghoffer, is killed.
 The Mameyes landslide in Puerto Rico kills close to 300 people in the worst ever landslide in North American history.
 October 15 – In separate events, mail bombs kill two people in Salt Lake City, Utah; a third bomb explodes the next day, injuring career counterfeiter Mark Hofmann. The ensuing police investigation leads to the arrest of Hofmann for the two murders.
 October 18 – The Nintendo Entertainment System is released in U.S. stores.
 October 27 – The Kansas City Royals defeat the St. Louis Cardinals, 4 games to 3, to win their first World Series Title.

November
 November 13 – Xavier Suárez is sworn in as Miami's first Cuban-born mayor.
 November 18 – The comic strip Calvin and Hobbes appears for the first time, in 35 newspapers.
 November 19 – Cold War: In Geneva, U.S. President Ronald Reagan and Soviet Union leader Mikhail Gorbachev meet for the first time.
 November 20 – Microsoft Corporation releases the first version of Windows, Windows 1.0.
 November 26 – U.S. President Ronald Reagan sells the rights to his autobiography to Random House for a record US$3,000,000.

December
 December 1 – The Ford Taurus and Mercury Sable are released for sale to the public.
 December 12 – Arrow Air Flight 1285, a Douglas DC-8, crashes after takeoff in Gander, Newfoundland, killing 256, 248 of whom were U.S. servicemen returning to Fort Campbell, Kentucky from overseeing a peacekeeping force in Sinai.
 December 16 – In New York City, Mafia bosses Paul Castellano and Thomas Bilotti are shot dead in front of Spark's Steak House, making hit organizer John Gotti the leader of the powerful Gambino crime family.
 December 24 – Right wing extremist David Lewis Rice murders civil rights attorney Charles Goldmark as well as Goldmark's wife and two children in Seattle. Rice suspected the family of being both Jewish and Communist, and claimed his dedication to the Christian Identity movement drove him to the crime.
 December 27 – American naturalist Dian Fossey is found murdered in Rwanda.
 December 31 – The last issue of The Columbus Citizen-Journal is circulated.

Undated
 "The Year of the Spy", name given by media to 1985 because of a large number of foreign spies arrested in the United States.
 Selected Manifestations book is published. 
 The Tommy Hilfiger brand is established.
 The Asian tiger mosquito, an invasive species, is first found in Houston, Texas.
 Why Me & Sherry's House, a non-profit organization, is established in Worcester, Massachusetts.
 ATI Technologies is founded (originally as Array Technology) in North America by Lee Ka Lau, Francis Lau, Benny Lau and Kwok Yuen Ho.

Ongoing
 Cold War (1947–1991)
 Iran–Contra affair (1985–1987)

Births

January

 January 1
 Chris Cayole, basketball player
 Juliana Harkavy, actress
 January 2
 Adrienne Lyle, Olympic dressage rider
 Heather O'Reilly, soccer player
 Greg Toler, football player
 January 3
 Asa Akira, pornographic actress and director
 Condrew Allen, football player
 Nicole Beharie, actress and singer
 John David Booty, football player
 January 4 – Al Jefferson, basketball player
 January 5 – Luvvie Ajayi, Nigerian-born author, speaker, and digital strategist
 January 6 – Ian M. Anderson, founder of Afternoon Records
 January 8
 Arctic Hospital, DJ and record producer
 Adam Cristman, soccer player
 Rachael Lampa, Christian singer
 Dan O'Connor, guitarist and frontman for Four Year Strong
 January 9
 Brett Camerota, Olympic Nordic combined skier
 Eric Camerota, Olympic Nordic combined skier
 January 10 – Alex Meraz, actor, dancer, and martial artist
 January 11
 Saba Ahmed, Pakistani-born political activist, lawyer, engineer, and founder of the Republican Muslim Coalition
 Lucy Knisley, comic artist and musician
 Aja Naomi King, actress
 January 12
 Cynthia Addai-Robinson, actress
 Issa Rae, actress
 January 14
 Billy Chiles, soccer player
 Michelle Wu, politician
 January 15 – Brandon Mebane, football player 
 January 16 
 Ash Christian, actor, film director, and producer (died 2020)
 Joe Flacco, football player
 Renée Felice Smith, actress
 January 18 – Matt Hobby, actor and comedian
 January 19
 Jake Allen, football player
 Damien Chazelle, film director and screenwriter
 January 20
 Antoine Agudio, basketball player
 Lauren Cahoon, Olympic Taekwondo practitioner
 Brantley Gilbert, country singer/songwriter
 January 21
 Nick Gehlfuss, actor
 Salvatore Giunta, U.S. Army Veteran in the Afghan War and Medal of Honor Recipient
 January 22
 Cory Ann Avants, tennis player
 Scott Cousins, baseball player
 Shana Cox, American-born British Olympic sprinter
 January 23 – Shola Adisa-Farrar, singer and actress
 January 25
 Brent Celek, football player
 Hartley Sawyer, actor, producer and writer
 Michael Trevino, actor
 January 26
 Emily Afton, singer and actress
 Sean Cameron, American-born Guyanese footballer
 Chico Camus, mixed martial artist
 Edwin Hodge, actor
 January 27 – Danial Ahmed, Pakistani-born cricketer
 January 28 – J. Cole, Hip-Hop musician and record producer
 January 29 – Mikey Hachey, bass player
 January 30
 Susannah Cahalan, journalist and author
 Janae Cox, gymnast
 Kevin Kiley, politician
 Trae Williams, football player
 January 31
 Russell Fry, politician
 Kalomira, Greek-born singer and model

February

 February 1
 Sohrab Ahmari, columnist, editor, and author of nonfiction books
 Alex Clark, Youtuber/animator
 Colin Curtis, baseball player
 February 2
 Morris Almond, basketball player
 Evan Alex Cole, actor
 Jake Luhrs, singer and frontman for August Burns Red
 Fontel Mines, football player
 February 4 – Bug Hall, actor 
 February 5
 Laurence Maroney, football player 
 Lindsey Cardinale, singer
 February 6
 Chester Adams, football player
 Patrick Carter, football player
 Kris Humphries, basketball player
 Crystal Reed, actress
 February 7 
 Derrick Lewis, mixed martial artist
 Tina Majorino, actress
 Deborah Ann Woll, actress
 February 8
 Jeremy Davis, bassist for Paramore (2004-2016)
 Bob Morris, singer-songwriter and guitarist for The Hush Sound
 Brian Randle, basketball player and coach
 February 9
 David Gallagher, actor
 Rachel Melvin, actress
 February 11
 Nicholas Altobelli, singer/songwriter
 William Beckett, singer/songwriter and frontman for The Academy Is...
 Ben Croft, racquetball player
 February 12 – Cuban-born mixed martial artist
 February 13
 Jon Applebaum, politician
 Dan Coleman, basketball player
 February 14
 Tyler Clippard, baseball player
 Jake Lacy, actor
 February 15 – Natalie Morales, actress
 February 16
 Logan Clark, mixed martial artist
 Stacy Lewis, golfer
 February 17 – Zelda Harris, actress
 February 19
 Haylie Duff, actress and singer-songwriter
 Arielle Kebbel, actress
 February 20 – TJ Kirk, YouTube personality
 February 21 – Ashley Costello, singer and vocalist for New Years Day,
 February 22
 Fred the Godson, rapper and DJ (died 2020)
 Sean Garballey, politician
 Ryan Hall, mixed martial artist
 Zach Roerig, actor
 February 23 – Sam Chelanga, Kenyan-born marathon runner
 February 24
 Gwen Araujo, murder victim (d. 2002)
 Priscilla Chan, philanthropist and co-founder and CEO of Meta Platforms
 February 25 – Joakim Noah, basketball player
 February 26 – Shiloh Fernandez, actor
 February 27
 Debra Arlyn, singer/songwriter and pianist
 Mohsin Charania, poker player
 Wendell Chavous, stock car racing driver
 Nicole Linkletter, model

March

 March 1
 Michael Conner Humphreys, actor
 Cole Sanchez, actor and artist
 March 2
 Reggie Bush, football player
 Robert Iler, actor
 March 3
 Steven Cozza, racing cyclist
 Toby Turner, Internet personality, actor, comedian and musician
 March 5
 Martin Casaus, wrestler
 Jason Cascio, soccer player
 Buzzy Cohen, recording music industry executive
 March 6
 Melinda Cooper, boxer
 Chad Jackson, football player
 March 7 – Guy Benson, columnist
 March 9
 Zach Andrews, basketball player
 Dominick Cruz, mixed martial artist
 Rachel Nabors, cartoonist
 March 10 – Cooper Andrews, actor
 March 13
 Emile Hirsch, actor
 Matt Jackson, pro wrestler
 Max Jenkins, actor and writer
 March 15
 Eva Amurri, actress
 Nick Chambers, comedian
 Kellan Lutz, fashion model and actor
 March 17
 Ellie Cachette, investor, philanthropist, and author of Software Agreements for Dummies
 Lauren Crandall, field hockey player
 March 18 – Kyle Alcorn, Olympic long distance runner
 March 19 – Esther Agbaje, politician
 March 20
 Chase Coleman, actor, director, and musician
 Britton Colquitt, football player
 March 21 
 Ryan Callahan, hockey player 
 Adrian Peterson, football player
 Sonequa Martin-Green, actress and producer
 March 22 
 Mike Jenkins, football player
 Justin Masterson, baseball player
 James Wolk, actor
 March 24 – Jeremy James Kissner, actor
 March 25
 Natalia Anciso, contemporary artist and educator
 Carmen Rasmusen, singer
 March 26
 Sarah Chang, actress, producer, stunt coordinator, and martial artist
 Matt Grevers, Olympic swimmer
 Jonathan Groff, actor and singer
 Francesca Marie Smith, actress and writer 
 March 27
 Aman Ali, comedian, storyteller, journalist, and writer
 Blake McIver Ewing, singer/songwriter, actor, model and pianist
 March 28
 Ian Axel, singer/songwriter
 Mark Melancon, baseball player
 March 30 – Russell Carter, basketball player
 March 31
 Jason Chery, football player
 Lee Cummard, basketball player
 Peter Porte, actor
 Jessica Szohr, actress

April

 April 1
 Ryan A. Conklin, television personality and U.S. Army Sergeant
 Daniel Murphy, baseball player
 Josh Zuckerman, actor
 April 2
 Matthew Antoine, Olympic skeleton racer
 Drew Atchison, football player
 April 3 – Gerald Coleman, ice hockey player
 April 4 – Todrick Hall, singer-songwriter, actor, director, choreographer and YouTuber 
 April 5 – Lastings Milledge, baseball player
 April 6 – Sinqua Walls, basketball player and actor
 April 7 – Joe Cook, basketball coach
 April 8 – Matt Antonelli, baseball player
 April 9 – David Robertson, baseball player
 April 10
 Barkhad Abdi, Somalian-born actor
 Kyle Clement, football player
 April 12
 Thomas Albert, politician
 Brennan Boesch, baseball player 
 April 13
 Carmen Carrera, model
 Jon Connor, rapper and record producer
 April 15
 Andre Caldwell, football player
 Chris Cates, baseball player
 John Danks, baseball player
 Aaron Laffey, baseball player
 April 16
 Matt Alonzo, director, video editor, and filmmaker
 Nate Diaz, mixed martial artist
 Sam Hyde, internet comedian
 April 17
 Jonathan Cheever, Olympic snowboarder
 Victoria Cisneros, boxer
 Rooney Mara, actress
 April 19 – Zack Conroy, actor
 April 20
 Brian Myers, wrestler
 Billy Magnussen, actor
 April 22
 Sam Altman,  entrepreneur, investor, programmer, blogger, CEO of OpenAI, and former president of Y Combinator
 Danny Cepero, soccer player
 April 23
 Blythe Auffarth, actress
 Warren Carter, basketball player
 April 26
 Matt Clackson, Canadian-born hockey player
 Tiffany Jackson, basketball player and coach (died 2022)
 Bre Scullark, fashion model and actress
 April 27 – Jamie Gray Hyder, actress and model
 April 28 – Brandon Baker, actor
 April 29
 Julia Clukey, Olympic luger
 Jay Lethal, wrestler

May

 May 2
 Kyle Busch, racing driver
 Sarah Hughes, Olympic figure skater
 May 3
 Becky Chambers, writer
 Meagan Tandy, actress and model
 May 4
Bo McCalebb, American-born Macedonian basketball player
Anthony Federov, Ukrainian-born singer
 May 5
 Clark Duke, actor, comedian, and director
 P. J. Tucker, basketball player
 May 6
 Cori Alexander, soccer player and photographer
 Chris Paul, basketball player
 May 7 – Andrew Carroll, hockey player (d. 2018) 
 May 8
 Tommaso Ciampa, wrestler
 Nick Cunningham, Olympic bobsledder
 Usama Young, football player
 May 9
 Audrina Patridge, television personality and actress 
 Chris Zylka, actor and model
 May 10 – Odette Annable, actress
 May 11 – Matt Giraud, singer, pianist and keyboardist
 May 12
 Tally Hall, soccer player
 Michael Jagmin, singer and frontman for A Skylit Drive
 May 13 – Victor Agosto, anti-war activist and former US Army private
 May 14
 Lina Esco, actress, producer and activist
 Dustin Lynch, Country singer/songwriter
 Zack Ryder, wrestler
 May 15
 Seth Adams, football player
 Jim Adduci, baseball player
 Ian Campbell, football player
 Jazmin Chaudhry, Bangladeshi-born actress
 May 16
 Ánh Minh, Vietnamese-born singer
 Sal Caccavale, soccer player
 Andrew Keenan-Bolger, actor, writer and director
 May 17
 Derek Hough, dancer, choreographer, musician and six-time Winner of Dancing with the Stars
 Matt Ryan, football player
 May 18
 Francesca Battistelli, Christian singer/songwriter
 Andrew Carpenter, baseball player
 May 19 – Chinonye Chukwu, Nigerian-born director
 May 20
 Caitlin Cahow, ice hockey player
 Jon Pardi, country singer/songwriter
 May 21
 Aung La Nsang, Burmese-born mixed martial artist
 Cameron Van Hoy, actor, producer and writer
 May 22
 T. J. Carter, basketball player
 Chris Salvatore, actor, singer/songwriter, model and gay rights activist
 Aakash Gandhi, composer, pianist, songwriter, and entrepreneur
 May 23 – Lindsey Anderson, Olympic middle-distance runner
 May 24 – John Vigilante, hockey player and coach (d. 2018)
 May 25
 Lauren Frost, actress and singer
 Roman Reigns, wrestler
 May 28
 Kaylin Andres, writer, artist, and fashion designer (d. 2016)
 Colbie Caillat, musician
 Billy Flynn, actor and producer
 Emily Wilson, actress
 May 29
 Blake Foster, actor and martial artist
 Heather Heyer, protestor who died in Charlottesville during the Unite the Right rally (d. 2017)
 May 30
 Niki Cross, soccer player
 Sam Gifaldi, child actor
 Turk McBride, football player
 May 31
 Justine Cotsonas, actress
 Navene Koperweis, progressive metal drummer

June

 June 1 – Ari Herstand, singer-songwriter
 June 2 – Maggie Thrash, graphic novelist 
 June 4 – Evan Lysacek, Olympic figure skater
 June 5
 Jeremy Abbott, Olympic figure skater
 Antonio Anderson, basketball player
 Kelsey Campbell, Olympic wrestler
 June 6 
 Abbie Cobb, actress and author
 Chris Henry, football player
 Becky Sauerbrunn, soccer player
 June 9 – Sebastian Telfair, basketball player 
 June 10
 Celina Jade, actress
 Kristina Apgar, actress
 June 11
 Daron Cruickshank, mixed martial artist
 Chris Trousdale, actor and recording artist (died 2020)
 June 12
 Jesse Anthony, cyclist
 Dave Franco, actor
 Blake Ross, software developer
 Kendra Wilkinson, model, actress and author
 Chris Young, singer/songwriter and guitarist
 June 13
 Sean Carlson, music promoter
 Christina Chang, American-born Jamaican footballer
 June 17
 Michael Adams, football player
 Tramell Tillman, actor
 June 18
 Jon Abbate, football player
 Jimmie Allen, country music singer/songwriter
 Sorel Carradine, actress
 Chris Coghlan, baseball player
 Alex Hirsch, animator and actor
 June 20
 Thaddeus Coleman, football player
 Matt Flynn, football player
 Mark Saul, actor
 June 21
 Kris Allen, musician, 8th American Idol winner 
 Sara Anundsen, tennis player
 DJ Candlestick, DJ, radio personality, and record producer
 Lana Del Rey, pop musician
 June 22 – Scott MacIntyre, singer
 June 23
 Roberto Castro, golfer
 Candice Patton, actress
 Marcel Reece, football player
 June 24
 Justin Hires, ator and comedian
 Jandy Nelson, Writer
 June 25 
 Annaleigh Ashford, actress and singer
 Daniel Bard, baseball player
 June 27
 Paul Downs Colaizzo, playwright, screenwriter, and film director
 Martin Sensmeier, actor
 June 28
 Cory Blair, rugby player
 Alexx Calise, singer/songwriter and musician
 June 29 – Steven Hauschka, football player 
 June 30
 Trevor Ariza, basketball player
 Tim Crowder, football player
 Michael Phelps, Olympic swimmer
 Cody Rhodes, wrestler and actor

July

 July 1 – Spose, Hip-Hop artist
 July 2 – Ashley Tisdale, actress, singer and producer
 July 4 – Sean Cunningham, musician, singer/songwriter, and recording artist
 July 5 – Megan Rapinoe, soccer player
 July 6
 John Chest, opera singer
 Matt Overton, football player
 D. Woods, pop musician 
 July 7 – Craig Capano, soccer player
 July 8
 David Clowney, football player
 Sterling Hyltin, ballerina
 July 9 – Cris Cyborg, Brazilian-born mixed martial artist
 July 10 – B. J. Crombeen, American-born Canadian ice hockey player
 July 11
 Robert Adamson, actor
 Faysal Ahmed, Yemeni-born actor
 Tiffany Andrade, beauty pageant winner, Miss New Jersey 2008
 Geoff Cameron, soccer player
 Mike Cox, football player
 July 12
 Ryan Amoroso, basketball player
 Casper Brinkley, football player
 Jasper Brinkley, football player
 Rob Menendez, politician
 July 14 – Darrelle Revis, football player
 July 15 – David Carpenter, baseball player
 July 16 – Rosa Salazar, actress
 July 17 – Caitlin Van Zandt, actress
 July 18
 Chace Crawford, actor
 Theo Croker, jazz trumpeter, composer, producer, and vocalist
 Hopsin, rapper and record producer
 July 19 – LaMarcus Aldridge, basketball player
 July 20 – John Francis Daley, actor
 July 22
 Lindsey Carmichael, Paralympic archer
 Takudzwa Ngwenya, Zimbabwean-born rugby player
 July 23 – Scott Chandler, football player
 July 24 – Chad Cook, football player
 July 25
 James Lafferty, actor
 Alex Presley, baseball player
 Shantel VanSanten, actress and model
 July 26 – Matt Riddlehoover, filmmaker
 July 27
 Husain Abdullah, football player
 Lou Taylor Pucci, actor
 Young Dolph, rapper (died 2021)
 July 28 – Monica Abbott, softball player
 July 29
 Charlotte Cho, esthetician, author, and entrepreneur
 Anna Grace Christiansen, racing cyclist
 July 30
 Dylan Axelrod, baseball player
 Mary Wiseman, actress
 July 31 – Shannon Curfman, blues-rock singer and guitarist

August

 August 3
 Tom Cox, politician
 Ryan Leone, novelist, film producer, artist, and prison reform activist (d. 2022)
 August 4 – Crystal Bowersox, singer/songwriter
 August 5 – Zach Appelman, actor
 August 6 – Michael Antonini, baseball player
 August 7 – Michael Campbell, guitarist and bassist
 August 8
 Rafael Casal, writer, actor, producer, and showrunner
 Anisha Nicole, singer
 August 9 
 Anna Kendrick, actress and singer
 Hayley Peirsol, swimmer
 Vivek Ramaswamy, entrepreneur, author, political activist, political candidate, and co-founder of Strive Asset Management
 JaMarcus Russell, football player
 Chandler Williams, football player (d. 2013)
 August 10
 Reggie Campbell, football player and Navy aviator in the United States Navy Reserve
 Jared Nathan, child actor (died 2006)
 August 11 – Asher Roth, rapper
 August 12 – Zack Cozart, baseball player
 August 13
 Jonathan Brookins, mixed martial artist
 Lacey Brown, singer
 August 15
 Emily Kinney, actress and singer/songwriter
 Nipsey Hussle, rapper (d. 2019)
 August 16
 Agnes Bruckner, actress
 Arden Cho, actress, singer, and model
 Cristin Milioti, actress and singer
 August 17 – Kennard Cox, football player
 August 18
 Desiree Casado, actress
 Brooke Harman, actress
 August 19 
 J. Evan Bonifant, actor 
 David A. Gregory, actor and writer
 Lindsey Jacobellis, Olympic snowboarder
 August 20
 Brant Daugherty, actor
 Michael Shuman, bassist for Queens of the Stone Age
 August 21 – Jake Pitts, singer/songwriter and lead guitarist for Black Veil Brides
 August 22
 Jimmy Needham, Christian singer/songwriter
 The Usos, twin brother wrestling duo
 August 25 – Wynter Gordon, pop/dance singer/songwriter
 August 26 – Brian Kelley, country singer and one half of Florida Georgia Line
 August 27 – 
 Jennifer Armour, actress and voice actress
 Kayla Ewell, actress
 Alexandra Nechita, painter
 Sean Foreman, singer/songwriter, member of electro hop group 3OH!3
 August 28
 Mike Alston, football player
 Pat Cassidy, film producer and music manager
 Jackson Crawford, scholar
 Ashlyne Huff, singer/songwriter and dancer
 August 29
 Alexander Artemev, Russian-born Olympic gymnast
 T. J. Conley, football player
 Jeffrey Licon, actor
 Marc Rzepczynski, baseball player

September

 September 1
 Jasmine Ann Allen, American-born Japanese voice actress, singer, and TV personality
 Camile Velasco, Filipina-born actress
 September 2 – Allison Miller, actress
 September 3 – Dominick Cruz, mixed martial artist
 September 4
 Jessa Anderson, Christian singer/songwriter
 Morgan Garrett, actress
 Kaillie Humphries, Olympic Bobsledder
 September 5 – Tyler Colvin, baseball player
 September 6
 Lynn Alvarez, mixed martial artist
 Robert Ayers, football player
 Gregg Cash, guitarist and music director
 Hugh Cha, South Korean-born actor, singer, and dancer
 Lauren Lapkus, actress and comedian
 Mitch Moreland, baseball player
 September 7
 Joe Craddock, football player and coach
 Alyssa Diaz, actress
 September 8 – Vanessa Baden, actress, writer, director and producer
 September 9
 Martin Johnson, singer/songwriter, record producer, guitarist and frontman for Boys Like Girls
 J. R. Smith, basketball player
 September 10
 Matt Angle, baseball player and coach
 Monica Lopera, Colombian-born actress
 September 11
 Bobby Cassevah, baseball player
 Chikezie, singer and American Idol contestant
 September 13 – Vella Lovell, actress
 September 14
 Paolo Gregoletto, bassist for Trivium
 Dilshad Vadsaria, actress
 September 15 – Chris Clemons, football player
 September 16
  Houston Barrow, wrestler
 Phil Sgrosso, guitarist for As I Lay Dying and Wovenwar (2013-2016)
 Madeline Zima, actress
 September 17
 Lindsay Adler, portrait and fashion photographer
 Zacardi Cortez, gospel musician
 Jon Walker, musician 
 September 18
 Megan Joy, singer
 Chris Riggi, actor
 September 19
 Zoë Chao, actress and screenwriter
 Chase Rice, country singer-songwriter
 September 21
 Ayad Al Adhamy, Bahraini-born multi-instrumentalist and record producer
 Justin Chapman, author, journalist, and politician
 CinnamonToastKen, internet personality and YouTuber
 Daron Clark, football player
 September 22
 Damiano Carrara, Italian-book chef, restauranter, and cookbook author
 Shad White, politician
 September 23
 Brian Brohm, football player
 Joba Chamberlain, baseball player
 Hasan Minhaj, comedian, political commentator and actor
 September 24
 Dan Charles, mixed martial artist
 Paige Miles, singer
 September 27
 Jamar Butler, basketball player
 Grace Helbig, Youtube personality, podcast host and comedian
 September 28 – Martin Courtney, singer and frontman for Real Estate
 September 29
 Andrew Forsman, drummer for The Fall of Troy
 Calvin Johnson, football player
 September 30
 Chris Chamberlain, football player
 Katrina Law, actress
 T-Pain, singer-songwriter, rapper, record producer and actor

October

 October 1
 Mitch Atkins, baseball player
 Porcelain Black, industrial pop singer/songwriter
 Chris Clark, football player
 Ryan M. Pitts, U.S. Army soldier in Afghan War, Medal of Honor Recipient
 Sicily Sewell, actress
 October 2
 Robbie Agnone, football player
 Tara Allain, beauty pageant winner, Miss Maine 2007
 October 3
 Jason Anick, jazz musician
 Courtney Lee, basketball player
 October 4
 Brad Bell, television producer, screenwriter, actor, musician and comic book author
 Clef nite, Nigerian-born guitarist
 October 5 – Brooke Valentine, singer
 October 6
 Tahanie Aboushi, civil rights lawyer and political candidate
 Sylvia Fowles, basketball player
 October 7 – Evan Longoria, baseball player
 October 8 
 Greg Carr, football player
 Max Crumm, actor and singer
 Bruno Mars, singer-songwriter, producer and actor
 October 9
 Charles Alexander, football player
 Nathan Crumpton, Olympic skeleton racer
 October 10
 Tasneem Alsultan, photographer, artist, and speaker
 Jaremi Carey, actor, streamer, singer, cosplay artist, and drag performer
 Aaron Himelstein, actor
 October 11 – Michelle Trachtenberg, actress, producer and singer
 October 12
 Michelle Carter, Olympic shot-putter
 Simeon Castille, football player
 October 14
 Daniel Clark, American-born Canadian actor, producer, and reporter
 Robert Costa, political reporter and chief election and campaign correspondent for CBS News
 Justin Forsett, football player
 October 15
 Arron Afflalo, basketball player
 Cory Asbury, Christian musician and pastor
 Kevin Craft, football player
 October 16 – Dylan Golden Aycock, guitarist
 October 18
 Yoenis Céspedes, Cuban-born baseball player
 Andrew Garcia, singer
 October 19 – Ian Calderon, politician
 October 20
 AnonymousCulture, rapper
 Jennifer Freeman, actress
 October 21 – Quinton Culberson, football player
 October 22
 Zac Hanson, drummer for Hanson
 Deontay Wilder, boxer
 October 23
 Masiela Lusha, Albanian-born actress, poet and humanitarian
 Adrian Perkins, politician, mayor of Shreveport, Louisiana
 October 24 – Donald Cowart, steeplechase runner
 October 25
 Colt Anderson, football player
 Ciara, singer
 John Robinson, actor
 Christopher Sean, actor
 October 27 – Briana Lane, actress and musician
 October 28 
 Troian Bellisario, actress
 Anthony Fantano, music critic
 Matt Greiner, drummer for August Burns Red
 October 29 – Adam Cappa, Christian rock singer/songwriter
 October 31
 Kerron Clement, Trinidadian-born hurdler and sprinter
 Paul Cram, actor
 Dan Cramer, mixed martial artist
 Kether Donohue, actress and singer

November

 November 2
 Danny Amendola, football player
 Anthony Collins, football player
 Dan Connor, football player
 Josh Grelle, actor
 November 3 – Tyler Hansbrough, basketball player
 November 4
 Tom Crabtree, football player
 Victoria Leigh Soto, teacher, Sandy Hook Elementary School shooting victim (k. 2012)
 November 5
 Erica Carney, racing cyclist
 Elizabeth Rice, actress
 November 6 – Shayne Lamas, reality television personality and actress
 November 7 – Adrian Arrington, football player
 November 8
 Mark Asper, football player
 Liam Coen, football coach
 Jack Osbourne, English-born television personality
 November 10 – Pete Andrelczyk, baseball player
 November 11
 Onision, controversial youtuber
 Pat Carroll, soccer player
 Jessica Sierra, singer
 November 12 – Arianny Celeste, model and actress
 November 13
 Michael Bennett, football player
 Asdrúbal Cabrera, Venezuelan-born baseball player
 Giovonnie Samuels, actress
 Kit Williamson, actor and filmmaker
 November 14
 Mara Abbott, Olympic cyclist
 Sage Canaday, long-distance runner
 Spencer Charnas, singer and frontman for Ice Nine Kills
 November 15 
 Lily Aldridge, model
 Richard Clebert, football player
 Charron Fisher, basketball player
 Nick Fradiani, singer
 Jeffree Star, YouTuber, entrepreneur, makeup artist and singer-songwriter
 November 18 
 Allyson Felix, Olympic sprinter
 Christian Siriano, fashion designer
 November 19 – Eve Carson, murder victim {d. 2008)
 November 20 – Dan Byrd, actor
 November 21 – Mark Cochran, politician
 November 22
 Daniel Cameron, politician
 Antonietta Collins, Mexican-born sportscaster
 November 23
 Troy Ave, rapper
 Mike Tolbert, football player 
 November 25
 Dan Carpenter, football player
 Haley Webb, actress and filmmaker
 November 26 – Matt Carpenter, baseball player
 November 29 – Jamar Adams, football player
 November 30
 Casely, singer
 Gia Crovatin, actress
 Kaley Cuoco, actress
 Chrissy Teigen, model

December

 December 1 
 John Coughlin, skater (d. 2019)
 Philip DeFranco, YouTube personality and vlogger
 Ilfenesh Hadera, actress
 Janelle Monáe, R&B/Soul Musician
 Svetlana Shusterman, Ukrainian-born television personality
 December 2 – Samuel Charles, football player
 December 3 – Amanda Seyfried, actress and singer-songwriter
 December 4 – Ronnie Ortiz-Magro, TV personality
 December 5
 Ryan Additon, MLB umpire
 Adam Anderson, monster truck driver
 Frankie Muniz, actor, musician, writer, producer and racing driver
 December 7
 S. A. Chakraborty, writer
 Jon Moxley, wrestler
 December 8
 Xavier Carter, sprinter
 Josh Donaldson, baseball player
 Dwight Howard, basketball player
 December 10
 Brandon Anderson, football player
 Edmund Entin, actor
 Matt Forte, football player
 T. J. Hensick, hockey player
 Meghan Linsey, singer/songwriter
 Raven-Symoné, actress, singer and dancer
 December 11 – Samantha Steele, sportscaster
 December 12
 Pat Calathes, American-born Greek basketball player
 Chris Jennings, football player
 Erika Van Pelt, singer
 David Veikune, football player
 December 16 – Amanda Setton, actress
 December 17 – Jeremy McKinnon, singer/songwriter, record producer and frontman for A Day to Remember
 December 18
 Aris Ambríz, boxer
 Tara Conner, model, television personality, beauty pageant titleholder, and Miss USA 2006
 December 19
 Katherine Chappell, film visual effects editor (d. 2015)
 Shane Bitney Crone, filmmaker, writer and advocate for LGBT rights
 Christina Loukas, Olympic diver
 December 20 – Paul Wandtke, metalcore drummer
 December 21 – James Stewart Jr., motorcycle racer
 December 23 – Arcángel, reggaeton singer
 December 24 – Edward Aschoff, sports reporter (d. 2019)
 December 26
 Beth Behrs, actress
 Michael Cammarata, entrepreneur, investor, and wellness industry executive
 Chris Carpenter, baseball player
 Mikal Cronin, musician and songwriter
 December 27
 Halley Gross, screenwriter
 Paul Stastny, Canadian-born hockey player
 December 28
 Dan Amboyer, actor 
 Taryn Terrell, wrestler
 December 29 – Alexa Ray Joel, singer/songwriter and pianist
 December 30
 Samuel Adams, composer
 Ryan Ammerman, volleyball player
 Hunter Cantwell, football player
 Anna Wood, actress
 December 31
 Antwan Applewhite, football player
 Brennen Carvalho, football player
 Jonathan Horton, Olympic gymnast

Full Date Unknown

 Alaska Thunderfuck, drag queen and TV personality
 Khalik Allah, filmmaker and photographer
 Catrina Allen, disc thrower
 Jojo Anavim, contemporary visual artist
 Timo Andres, composer and pianist
 J. J. Anselmi, writer and musician
 Jennifer Arcuri, technology entrepreneur
 Alex Askew, politician
 Adam Brown, politician
 John Burris, politician
 Dorielle Caimi, artist
 Chris Campanioni, writer
 Alana I. Capria, writer
 Ana Caraiani, Romanian-born mathematician
 Charlene Carruthers, LGBT activist and author
 Gary Chambers, activist and political candidate
 Greg Chevalier, soccer player
 Stephen Christy, producer, entertainment executive, and editor
 Alex Clark, comedian, animator, YouTuber, and juggler
 Telfar Clemens, fashion designer and founder of TELFAR
 Zinzi Clemmons, writer
 Stephanie Cmar, chef
 Foo Conner, activist, entrepreneur, and journalist
 Kevin Michael Connolly, photographer
 Craig Considine, scholar of Islam
 Moogega Cooper, astronomer
 Kimberly Corban, rape survivor and rape victim advocate
 Jolene Creighton, journalist and media executive

Deaths

 January 7 – Ruth Godfrey, actress (born 1922)
 January 13 – Carol Wayne, actress (born 1942)
 January 19 – Eric Voegelin, German-American philosopher (born 1901)
 January 20 – Gillis William Long, politician (b. 1923)
 February 16 – Mathew Beard, supercentenarian, last surviving person born in 1870 (b. 1870)
 February 21 – John G. Trump, electrical engineer, inventor, and physicist (b. 1907)
 February 22 – Alexander Scourby, actor (born 1913)
 March 13 – Annette Hanshaw, singer (b. 1901)
 April 1 – Douglass Wallop, author and playwright (b. 1920)
 April 8 – John Frederick Coots, songwriter (b. 1897)
 April 22 – Paul H. Emmett, American chemical engineer (b. 1900)
 April 23 – Kent Smith, American actor (b. 1907)
 April 24 – Mildred W. Pelzer, American artist (b. 1889)
 September 2 – Jay Youngblood, wrestler (b. 1955)
 September 11 – Andrew C. Thornton II, narcotics officer, lawyer, and the head member of a drug smuggling ring in Kentucky (b. 1944)
 October 2 – Rock Hudson, actor (b. 1925)
 October 10
 Yul Brynner, Russian-born American actor (b. 1920)
 Orson Welles, actor and director (born 1915)
 October 25 – Blair Lee III, politician, Lieutenant Governor of Maryland (b. 1916)
 November 1
 Rick McGraw, wrestler (b. 1955)
 Phil Silvers, entertainer (b. 1911)
 November 4 – Cus D'Amato, legendary boxing trainer who was a mentor to hall of famer boxers Mike Tyson, Floyd Patterson and José Torres.
 November 16
 Stuart Chase, economist (b. 1888)
 John Sparkman, United States Senator from Alabama from 1946 till 1979. (b. 1899)
 November 25 – Ray Jablonski, American baseball player (b. 1926)

See also 
 1985 in American television
 List of American films of 1985
 Timeline of United States history (1970–1989)

References

External links
 

 
1980s in the United States
United States
United States
Years of the 20th century in the United States